The Hughes XF-11 (redesignated XR-11 in 1948) was a prototype military reconnaissance aircraft designed and flown by Howard Hughes and built by Hughes Aircraft for the United States Army Air Forces (USAAF). Although 100 F-11s were ordered in 1943, the program was delayed beyond the end of World War II, rendering the aircraft surplus to USAAF requirements; the production contract was canceled and only two prototypes and a static test mockup were completed. During the first XF-11 flight in 1946, piloted by Hughes, the aircraft crashed in Beverly Hills, California, and was destroyed. The second prototype was flown in 1947 but was used only briefly for testing before being stricken from inventory in 1949. The program was controversial from the beginning, leading the U.S. Senate to investigate the XF-11 and the Hughes H-4 Hercules flying boat in 1946–1947.

Design and development
The F-11 was intended to meet the same USAAF operational objective as the Republic XF-12 Rainbow: a fast, long-range, high-altitude photographic reconnaissance aircraft. A highly modified version of the earlier private-venture Hughes D-2, it resembled the Lockheed P-38 Lightning, but was much larger and heavier. Hughes Aircraft Company founder Howard Hughes had first promoted the D-2 as a "pursuit type airplane", (i.e. a fighter aircraft), but it lacked both the maneuverability of a fighter and the load-carrying capacity of bomber, and could not accommodate required military equipment; additionally, the USAAF Materiel Command objected to its wooden Duramold construction due to a perceived lack of durability under fire. Hughes was determined to win a military contract but soon realized that the USAAF was highly unlikely to accept the D-2, so he began petitioning USAAF leaders to issue a contract to redesign it for photographic reconnaissance, and spent several million dollars hiring additional staff and opening a new engineering office for the effort.

Hughes campaigned the USAAF in Washington, enlisting his father's friend, Secretary of Commerce Jesse Holman Jones, who met with President Franklin Roosevelt in June 1942 to discuss the project. Hughes later found out that Colonel Elliott Roosevelt, the president's son, would visit Hughes Aircraft in August 1943 in the process of surveying several reconnaissance aircraft proposals. When Roosevelt and his team arrived on August 11, Hughes' public relations agent John Meyer showed them the D-2 prototype, took them on a tour of several Hollywood film studios, and introduced Roosevelt to actress Faye Emerson, whom Roosevelt would later marry. Meyer encouraged Roosevelt and his entourage to stay in a private home at his expense, and when Roosevelt demurred, Meyer paid their hotel bill. After Roosevelt left, Meyer invited him to parties he was hosting in New York City and took him to Manhattan nightclubs, where Meyer paid. On August 20, Roosevelt submitted a report to General Henry "Hap" Arnold, chief of the U.S. Army Air Forces, recommending the Hughes proposal. Arnold ordered 100 F-11s for delivery beginning in 1944, overriding the strenuous objections of Materiel Command, which held that Hughes Aircraft lacked the industrial capacity and track record to deliver on its founder's promises, and recommended that Arnold should instead approve a reconnaissance version of the Lockheed XP-58. Arnold later regretted the decision, saying that he made it "much against my better judgment and the advice of my staff" after consultations with the White House.

A preliminary $43 million contract issued on 11 October 1943 was contested by Hughes, who sought $3.6 to $3.9 million in compensation for the development of the D-2, and objected to Materiel Command's requirements for all-metal construction, self-sealing fuel tanks, and various other major design changes that undermined his contention that the F-11 was directly derived from the D-2. The USAAF strongly objected, arguing that the D-2 project was initiated without USAAF input, and that Hughes had continuously withheld information about the aircraft. In another complication, the War Production Board (WPB) wanted Hughes to build a new assembly plant near Hughes Tool Company headquarters in Houston, where labor costs were lower than in southern California. The WPB eventually allowed the company to use its existing Culver City, California, assembly plant and the USAAF made some small design concessions, but Hughes failed to secure full reimbursement and ultimately agreed to most of the design changes, notably including the elimination of Duramold. The protracted negotiations consumed the better part of ten months, and the final contract was awarded on 1 August 1944. Hughes was awarded $1.6 million in reimbursement.

The program was plagued by managerial and logistical delays. By early 1944, Hughes was suffering from mental strain from the demands of managing both the F-11 and Hughes H-4 Hercules projects, and had become withdrawn. Warned that the USAAF was considering canceling the F-11 due to a lack of progress, Hughes hired Charles Perrell, former vice president of production at Consolidated Vultee, to manage the program, promising him full and unconditional control. Perrell found Hughes Aircraft rife with inefficiency and suffering from a "complete lack of experience in the design and construction of airplanes in general." His efforts to reorganize were hindered by resistance from senior Hughes Aircraft engineers, who were accustomed to a freewheeling work atmosphere, and from Hughes Tool executives who feared that Perrell would usurp their authority over the aircraft company. 21 engineers, including chief engineer Ed West, resigned in a May 1944 dispute over their offices being moved from Brea, California, to the Culver City plant. The prototype's wings–subcontracted to Fleetwings–were delivered six months behind schedule in April 1945. With the end of the European war in May 1945, the order for 100 F-11s was reduced to just three, a static test model and the two prototypes, and the USAAF de-prioritized the project. The engines were delivered seven months behind schedule in September 1945. By this time, Perrell had been successful in reforming the program, but there was no longer any impetus to deliver 98 production aircraft, and Hughes returned from self-imposed exile and began to interfere despite his earlier promises not to do so. Relations between the two men deteriorated and Hughes had Perrell fired in December.

The XF-11 emerged as a tricycle landing gear, twin-engine, twin-boom all-metal monoplane with a pressurized central crew nacelle and a much larger wingspan and higher aspect ratio than the P-38 or the D-2. The XF-11 used a pair of Pratt & Whitney R-4360-31 28-cylinder radial engines and was normally flown by a crew of two, but could accommodate a third crewmember in the central nacelle to process film in flight. Each engine drove a pair of contra-rotating four-bladed, variable-pitch propellers, which proved troublesome in testing, having a tendency to suddenly and inexplicably reverse pitch. The first prototype was conditionally accepted by the USAAF on 5 April 1946 although its electrical and hydraulic systems were incomplete.

Operational history

First prototype and Beverly Hills crash

The first prototype, tail number 44-70155, piloted by Hughes, crashed on 7 July 1946 while on its maiden flight from the Hughes Aircraft factory airfield at Culver City.

Hughes did not follow the agreed testing program and communications protocol, and remained airborne almost twice as long as planned. He may have been distracted by landing gear retraction problems, requesting that another aircraft be flown alongside to observe the operation of the gear. An hour into the flight (after onboard recording cameras had run out of film), a leak caused the right-hand propeller controls to lose their effectiveness and the rear propeller subsequently reversed its pitch, disrupting that engine's thrust, which caused the aircraft to yaw hard to the right. Rather than feathering the propeller, Hughes performed improvised troubleshooting (including raising and lowering the gear again) during which he flew away from his factory runway. Constantly losing altitude, he finally attempted to reach the golf course of the Los Angeles Country Club, but about  short of the course, the aircraft suddenly lost altitude and clipped three houses. The third house was destroyed by fire, and Hughes was nearly killed.

USAAF investigators concluded that, "It appeared that loss of hydraulic fluid caused failure of the pitch change mechanism of right rear propeller. Mr. Hughes maintained full power of right engine and reduced that of left engine instead of trying to fly with right propeller windmilling without power. It was Wright Field's understanding that the crash was attributed to pilot error," yet Hughes successfully brought suit against Hamilton Standard for the malfunctioning contra-rotating blades in the right propeller. The crash was dramatized in the 2004 biographical film The Aviator.

Second prototype
The second prototype, 44-70156, was fitted with conventional single four-bladed propellers, and was flown by Hughes on 5 April 1947. Initially, the USAAF had insisted that Hughes not be allowed to fly the aircraft, but after a personal appeal to Generals Ira Eaker and Carl Spaatz, he was allowed to do so against posting of $5 million in security. The USAAF demanded that the aircraft be trucked from Culver City to Muroc Dry Lake for the flight, fearing the repercussions of another crash in a populated area.

This test flight was uneventful, and the aircraft proved stable and controllable at high speed. It lacked low-speed stability, however, as the ailerons were ineffective at low altitudes. When the USAAF evaluated it against the Republic XF-12, testing revealed the XF-11 was harder to fly and maintain, and it was projected to be twice as expensive to build. An F-12 production order was issued, but the USAAF ultimately canceled it in favor of the RB-50 Superfortress and Northrop F-15 Reporter, both of which had similar long-range photo-reconnaissance capability and were available at a much lower cost.

The United States Air Force (USAF) was created as a separate service in September 1947, and the XF-11 was redesignated as the XR-11 in July 1948. The surviving prototype arrived at Eglin Field, Florida, in December 1948 from Wright Field, Ohio, to undergo operational suitability testing. The airframe was transferred to Sheppard Air Force Base, Texas, and was authorized to be scrapped on 26 July 1949, but was used as a ground maintenance trainer by the 3750th Technical Training Wing until November 1949 when it was dropped from the USAF inventory. The F-11 program cost the federal government $14,155,235, and Hughes absorbed at least a quarter of this amount in sunk costs from the D-2.

Senate investigation

From 1946-1947, the U.S. Senate Special Senate Committee Investigating the National Defense Program—popularly known as the Truman Committee—investigated the F-11 and H-4 programs, leading to the highly publicized Hughes-Roosevelt hearings in August 1947. Maine senator and committee chairman Ralph Owen Brewster sought to discredit the rival Roosevelt family and Hughes; in addition to securing the controversial XF-11 and H-4 contracts, Hughes had also backed recent legislation that favored Trans World Airlines, which Hughes then controlled, over Pan American World Airways, which Brewster backed. The committee revealed that John Meyer had spent $169,661 entertaining Elliott Roosevelt and other USAAF officers overseeing reconnaissance aircraft procurement. On 4 August 1947, Meyer and Roosevelt testified before the committee and denied any wrongdoing or improper influence. Howard Hughes subsequently testified before the committee and is generally thought to have successfully deflected criticism of his company's alleged mismanagement of the F-11 and H-4 contracts.

Specifications (XF-11)

See also

Notes

Footnotes

Bibliography

  First published in 1979 as Empire: The Life, Legend, and Madness of Howard Hughes
 
 
 
 
 
 .

Further reading

External links

 Check-Six.com - The Crash of the XF-11 - Numerous details and photos of the crash
 UNLV Library Archive - Hughes' account of the crash

F-11
Hughes F-11
Twin-boom aircraft
High-wing aircraft
Cancelled military aircraft projects of the United States
Aircraft with contra-rotating propellers
Howard Hughes
Articles containing video clips
Aircraft first flown in 1946
Twin piston-engined tractor aircraft